The Infamous Archives is an album by Queensbridge hip-hop duo Mobb Deep on March 13, 2007. The album consists of previously unreleased tracks. The first disc contains Mobb Deep's Back from a Hiatus mixtape from 1998. Rappers such as Sticky Fingaz, 50 Cent, Snoop Dogg and Busta Rhymes are featured. The song "In the Long Run", Prodigy spoke about the altercation between him and Keith Murray. In Prodigy's book, he stated this release wasn't authorized by the group.

Track listing

Mobb Deep albums
Hip hop compilation albums
2007 compilation albums
Gangsta rap compilation albums
Albums produced by Havoc (musician)